The Half-Way Girl is a 1925 American silent drama film directed by John Francis Dillon that was filmed around the Jersey Shore.

Plot
As described in a film magazine reviews, Poppy La Rue is given a job in the hotel as “private hostess”(generally a silent film era euphemism for prostitute) as an alternative to jail when her theatrical troupe from the United States is stranded and cannot pay the hotel bill in Singapore. She becomes interested in Phil Douglas, a nerve shattered war veteran disgusted with life. Douglas kills “The Crab” in an attempted theft of Douglas’ wallet. He is put on  board the ship Mandalay by Poppy despite that the highest police official in India has threatened to send her to Malay Street if she continues to interest herself in Douglas. She is rescued from Malay Street, the red-light district, and put on the Mandalay by Jardine, a plantation owner, who is determined to have Poppy. The vessel catches fire and Poppy rescues Douglas from the ship's hold, and he rescues Poppy from Jardine's advances. They manage to get in a lifeboat just before the ship explodes, and they are picked up by another ship. It is learned that the police official, mentioned, is the father of Douglas, who wants the couple to separate, but finally he accepts Poppy as a daughter-in-law. Poppy and Douglas are married.

Cast 
Doris Kenyon as Poppy La Rue
Lloyd Hughes as Phil Douglas
Hobart Bosworth as John Guthrie
Tully Marshall as The Crab
Sam Hardy as Jardine
Charles Wellesley as Gibson
Martha O'Dwyer as Miss Brown (credited as Martha Madison)
Sally Crute as Effie

Crew
Directed by: John Francis Dillon
Cinematography by: George J. Folsey
Film Editing by: Marion Fairfax
Art Direction by: Milton Menasco
Story by: E. Lloyd Sheldon, Joseph F. Poland and Earle Snell

Production
The spectacular fire aboard an ocean liner was shot in color, and to make it even more exciting, a leopard also breaks free on the ship. The Corvallis, a 270-foot wooden-hulled cargo ship that was surplus from World War I, was purchased from the United States Government by First National Pictures for a fraction of her original cost. First National Pictures bought her for the sole purpose of blowing her up in The Half-Way Girl. After the explosion, the stern remained afloat and had to be sunk by the United States Coast Guard. It was claimed that blowing up an actual ship saved $25,000 over the cost of creating the scene using miniatures.

Preservation
With no prints of The Half-Way Girl located in any archives, it is a lost film.

References

External links

Still of Doris Kenyon and other women in the cast toasting Kenyon, at gettyimages.com

1925 films
1925 drama films
1925 lost films
American black-and-white films
American silent feature films
Films about actors
Films directed by John Francis Dillon
Films set in Singapore
Films shot in New Jersey
First National Pictures films
Lost American films
Silent American drama films
Films with screenplays by Joseph F. Poland
1920s American films